Khadija Salum Ally Al-Qassmy (born April 5, 1958) is a Member of Parliament in the National Assembly of Tanzania. She is a member of the Civic United Front party. From 1978–1990 she was a teacher within the Ministry of Education of Zanzibar. Aside from her political career she has been a self-employed businesswoman since 1991.

References

External links
 Parliament of Tanzania website

1958 births
Living people
Members of the National Assembly (Tanzania)
Civic United Front politicians
Zanzibari politicians
20th-century Tanzanian women politicians
Tanzanian women in business